Svínoy is an island located in the north-east of the Faroe Islands, to the east of Borðoy and Viðoy. It takes its name from Old Norse, Svíney, meaning "Swine Isle". Svinoy also refers to a section of the ocean where North Atlantic water flows into the Norwegian Sea.  There is a similarly named island, Swona, in the Orkney Islands.

Svínoy like Kalsoy is a comparatively isolated island, in that there are no bridge, tunnel or causeway links to it. There are boat and helicopter connections.

Geography
Svínoy is divided into two unequally sized peninsulas.  The coast is mostly steep slopes and cliffs, including the  precipice of Eysturhøvdi on the north coast.  It has only one settlement, also named Svínoy, where all the inhabitants live.

Important Bird Area
The coastline of the island has been identified as an Important Bird Area by BirdLife International because of its significance as a breeding site for seabirds, especially European storm petrels (25,000 pairs), Atlantic puffins (10,000 pairs) and black guillemots (100 pairs).

Mountains

There are seven mountains on Svínoy:

History 
975 Viking Chief Svínoyar-Bjarni is mentioned in the Færeyinga saga. A headstone in the church is assumed to be Bjarni's memorial stone.
1583 Jacob Eudensen from Svinoy was the last person in the Faroe Islands to be condemned to death for heresy; he had refused to renounce his Catholic faith and convert to Lutheranism.

Gallery

References

External links 
 personal website with 9 aerial photos of Svínoy

Islands of the Faroe Islands
Important Bird Areas of the Faroe Islands